Bell Road is a major east-west arterial road in the northern Phoenix, Arizona metropolitan area. It is one of the few roadways to cross the Agua Fria River in the northwestern part of the metro area, providing a vital link between the growing suburb of Surprise with Phoenix. As a result, the portion of Bell Road passing through Surprise and Sun City is the busiest arterial road in the state of Arizona.

The road is named for farmer Harvey Bell, who, together with James Shea, formed in 1916 the Paradise Verde Irrigation District.

Route description
The street lies at the 17000 North alignment of the Maricopa County grid system. Traveling west, the road intersects State Route 51 and Interstate 17 in Phoenix, the Loop 101 (Agua Fria Freeway) in Peoria, and Grand Avenue and Loop 303 in Surprise. West of the Beardsley Canal, the roadway curves around the White Tank Mountain Regional Park, becoming the Sun Valley Parkway.

East of 66th Street, Bell Road takes a southeasterly bend and, at its intersection with Scottsdale Road, becomes Frank Lloyd Wright Boulevard, named in recognition of the architect and designer. This alignment was built in the mid-1970s during the construction of the CAP canal, which Frank Lloyd Wright Boulevard parallels.

East of the McDowell Mountains, the Bell Road alignment forms the northern boundary of the city of Fountain Hills.

Prominent locations on or near Bell Road include the Scottsdale Municipal Airport, Turf Paradise, Arrowhead Towne Center and the Peoria Sports Complex. Bell Road also forms the northern boundary of the original town site of Surprise.

Major intersections

References

Transportation in Maricopa County, Arizona
Surprise, Arizona
Transportation in Phoenix, Arizona
Transportation in Scottsdale, Arizona
Streets in Arizona